Custom Ink is an American online retail company headquartered in Fairfax, Virginia that makes custom clothing and other items such as T-shirts, sweatshirts, bags, and tech accessories.

History 
Custom Ink was launched in 1999 (as CustomInk) by former college classmates Marc Katz, Dave Christensen, and Mike Driscoll.

In November 2013, Custom Ink received $40 million from Revolution Growth, the investment fund run by Steve Case, Ted Leonsis, and Donn Davis. The investment reportedly helped the growth of two new projects: Booster and Pear. Booster (later Custom Ink Fundraising) was launched by Andrew Moss (previously founder of BuyWithMe) who rejoined Custom Ink after being one of the original CustomInk founding members.

In 2019, Custom Ink's investors sold their shares for an undisclosed amount.

Acquisitions 
On February 4, 2016, Custom Ink acquired the Los Angeles company Represent.com, which helps celebrities sell limited-run T-shirts and merchandise to fans and followers. In 2019, CustomInk purchased Sidestep, a website and mobile app that strictly sells concert merchandise. The acquisition was done through CustomInk's subsidiary Represent.

In November 2021, the company purchased New York City-based giveaway startup Swag.com for an undisclosed amount. Two months later, in January 2022, the company acquired Printfection, a swag management platform.

Awards 

In 2014, Fortune and Great Place to Work ranked Custom Ink as one of their Top 100 places to work.

References 

Clothing companies of the United States
Clothing companies established in 1999
Retail companies established in 1999
Internet properties established in 1999
Online retailers of the United States
1999 establishments in Virginia